Loeseneriella is a genus of flowering plants belonging to the family Celastraceae.

Its native range is Tropical and Subtropical Old World. It is found in the countries and regions of Andaman Is., Angola, Assam, Bangladesh, Benin, Bismarck Archipelago, Borneo, Botswana, Burkina, Burundi, Cabinda, Cambodia, Cameroon, Caprivi Strip, Caroline Is., Central African Republic, Chad, China, Comoros, Congo, Equatorial Guinea, Ethiopia, Gabon, Gambia, Ghana, Guinea, Guinea-Bissau, Hainan, India, Ivory Coast, Java, Kenya, Laos, Lesser Sunda Islands, Liberia, Madagascar, Malawi, Malaya, Mali, Maluku, Mauritania, Mozambique, Myanmar, New Guinea, New South Wales (Australia), Nicobar Is., Niger, Nigeria, Northern Provinces (South Africa), Philippines, Queensland (Australia), Rwanda, Senegal, Sierra Leone, Solomon Is., Somalia, Sri Lanka, Sudan, Sulawesi, Sumatera, Tanzania, Thailand, Togo, Uganda, Vanuatu, Vietnam, Zambia, Zaïre and Zimbabwe
 
The genus name of Loeseneriella is in honour of Ludwig Eduard Theodor Loesener (1865–1941), a German botanist who collected widely in the field in Germany. 
It was first described and published in Amer. J. Bot. Vol.28 on page 438 in 1941.

Known species
According to Kew:

Loeseneriella africana 
Loeseneriella andamanica 
Loeseneriella apiculata 
Loeseneriella apocynoides 
Loeseneriella barbata 
Loeseneriella bourdillonii 
Loeseneriella camerunica 
Loeseneriella chesseana 
Loeseneriella clematoides 
Loeseneriella concinna 
Loeseneriella crenata 
Loeseneriella cumingii 
Loeseneriella dinhensis 
Loeseneriella ectypopetala 
Loeseneriella griseoramula 
Loeseneriella iotricha 
Loeseneriella lenticellata 
Loeseneriella macrantha 
Loeseneriella merrilliana 
Loeseneriella nicobarica 
Loeseneriella parkinsonii 
Loeseneriella pauciflora 
Loeseneriella rowlandii 
Loeseneriella rubiginosa 
Loeseneriella serrata 
Loeseneriella sogerensis 
Loeseneriella urceolus 
Loeseneriella yaundina 
Loeseneriella yunnanensis

References

Celastraceae
Celastrales genera
Plants described in 1845
Flora of West Tropical Africa
Flora of West-Central Tropical Africa
Flora of Northeast Tropical Africa
Flora of East Tropical Africa
Flora of South Tropical Africa
Flora of Madagascar
Flora of tropical Asia
Flora of Indo-China
Flora of Malesia
Flora of Papuasia
Flora of New South Wales
Flora of Queensland
Taxa named by Albert Charles Smith